The Sims Medieval is a life simulation video game that was released in March 2011 by Electronic Arts for Microsoft Windows and Mac OS X, and on September 22, 2011 for iOS, as part of The Sims series. It was also made available for Windows Phone on March 26, 2013. Set in medieval times, it allows the player to build a kingdom through quest-driven gameplay. During presentation at E3 2010, a pre-order exclusive Limited Edition was also available.

Gameplay

Main gameplay and objectives 
The Sims Medieval is a life-simulation game with action-adventure elements. The storyline of the game is to build a successful kingdom by fulfilling the player's "Kingdom Ambition," which the player chooses at the start of the game. Once an ambition has been completed, the play will unlock new ambitions for future playthroughs as well as unlocking freeplay for that specific kingdom.

The major difference in the gameplay is that the game is quest-driven. With the game stopped, the player has to choose a quest (quests are required to fulfill said kingdom ambition), and then choose which hero Sim they want to use.

A player can create Hero Sims to control, each one having a profession (monarch, knight, merchant, etc.).

The character creation, simulation, and architectural aspects are significantly reduced and altered to enforce a sharper focus on role-playing-style gameplay. For example, players are able to customize the aesthetics and layout of building interiors, but unable to alter the basic structure and shape of buildings.

With the quest and the Hero Sim(s) selected, the game un-pauses and the player is able to control the chosen Hero Sim(s) during the quest. When the quest is completed, another quest must be selected and another choice of Hero Sim(s) must be made. During quests other non-controlled Sims (even the Heroes created by the player) live in the kingdom, and will continue their life while the quest is going on, like in the story progression feature in The Sims 3.

In an interview with GameSpot, senior producer Rachel Bernstein stated that the game will be more dangerous for Sims, with death and failure a possibility during the game's quests. Listed dangers included low focus on quests, plague, peasant revolts, wildlife, poisons, duels, and more. Players earn ratings at the end of the game depending on their performance. Players may also reach "Quest Failed" screens if they do not complete a predefined goal in a predetermined amount of time.

Quests 
A player's main goal is to complete the quest by following the indicated quest-related actions. However, it is also important to excel at the quest so better rewards are given. How the Hero Sim is doing in the quest can be seen in the quest performance meter.

Besides the quest and quest performance, players' Sims have various jobs, and each job has its own duties (called responsibilities) that they will be given to fulfill daily (two per day). Doing so will raise their focus, their in-game mood, which has a major involvement in the way the Sim performs many interactions, as well as in the quest performance itself.

Other 
Some of the actions in the game, including completing quests, give the Hero Sim experience points. After earning some experience points, the hero will level up. Leveling up unlocks profession crafts or actions, imbuing the game with an RPG-style feel. This system of levelling up is similar to the professions in The Sims 3: Ambitions.

In addition to completing quests and doing their job, Hero Sims can also marry and raise a family. A Sim's spouse and children are NPCs (although the player can decide to marry two created Hero Sims). Aging is mostly the same as The Sims; babies grow into children, but children don't grow any older. The one exception is if a Hero Sim dies in the course of a quest, in which case a player can choose to have a child grow up and inherit their role. Hero Sims can put their children to work gathering resources for them.

Much like The Sims, the characters in the game do not progress through life stages: although Sims are still able to procreate, the resulting children only age to adulthood if one of their hero parents die, in which case they take their place. Each Sim has two normal traits and one fatal flaw, which can be turned into a positive trait through a quest, unlike The Sims 3, where there are five main traits depending on the age group.

Hero types 
Players are able to control several types of 'heroes', or professions, each with different abilities and responsibilities. These include:

 Monarchs will control the kingdom and be able to deal with neighboring kingdoms diplomatically. They can engage in duels, marry important NPCs, and issue proclamations or edicts. Their title changes between Lord/Lady, King/Queen and Emperor/Empress depending on the number of territories they have annexed.
 Wizards can enchant or fight using their spells, which are learned from a large spellbook and include motions which must be memorized.
 Spies can poison other Sims, or steal for the kingdom.
 Priests come in two varieties, Peteran and Jacoban. Peteran Priests follow a simpler path and try to convert Sims with uplifting sermons. Jacoban Priests use fear as a conversion tool and wear expensive clothing.
 Blacksmiths use ore mined in the kingdom to produce armor and arms.
 Physicians are expected to keep people healthy using period technology, particularly leeches.
 Knights can train for strength and endurance and are used to conquer new lands.
 Merchants have access to foreign goods and trade opportunities.
 Bards can recite poetry and play lute music for other Sims.

Development 
Producer Rachel Bernstein stated that subsurface scattering had been added to character models to give the characters a "painterly look". Other upgrades are reported to include "next-gen sims tech", and a new engine for light within the game.

Another difference/upgrade is the terrain used in the game. Whereas the terrain or neighborhoods in The Sims 3 or other Sim games was generally flat for the purpose of building, The Sims Medieval's terrain (or kingdom) is varied in altitudes and layouts resulting in a realistic display of geography. The terrain in the game also has a "painterly look" as do the Sims of the game thanks to the enhanced engine. An official update has been released which fixes minor graphic problems.

Release 
Bernstein conducted multiple media interviews, narrated demos and a television marketing campaign was launched. Some advertisements featured actor Donald Faison. Patrick Stewart narrated both the "epic trailer" and the intro cinematic.

Reception 

The PC and iOS versions received "generally favorable reviews" according to the review aggregation website Metacritic. Nicole Tanner of IGN said of the PC version, "The Sims Medieval has successfully breathed new life into a franchise that was getting pretty stale. Even with its minor flaws, The Sims Medieval mixes a great sense of humor with simple role-playing game mechanics that result in hours of fun," she added.

Felix Atkin of The Observer praised the game, deeming it as "enchanting stuff set in a beautifully animated and immersive fairy-tale world. [And,] with a clearer structure for achieving quests and character development, it will appeal to RPG fans as never before," he added. Video game magazine Edge wrote, "It's a funny and sweet time sink, and something that any Sims fan can wholeheartedly enjoy." AJ Glasser of GamePro said, "As let down as I am, though, I'm not ready to get out my pitchfork. Some things in this game kept me coming back for 20 hours. [...] The Sims Medieval is a beautiful game with fun and interesting ideas, but it doesn't live up to my fantasy of the Middle Ages and it doesn't completely satisfy the Sims fan in me."

Greg Tito of The Escapist gave the PC version a score of four stars out of five, saying, "Maxis wagered that adding fun new game elements to its blockbuster franchise would work, and The Sims Medieval succeeds sufficiently to start its own branching franchise. Expect an expansion pack or ten." Roger Hargreaves of Metro gave it seven out of ten, calling it "A surprisingly daring mix of interactive narrative, role-playing game and life simulator – and nothing like the lazy cash-in you'd expect." However, Samantha Nelson of The A.V. Club gave it a B−, saying, "While some Sims fans might find the addition of quests and a leveling system makes the game even more addictive, The Sims Medieval does away with some of the series' classic components, like designing buildings and watching your Sims age."

Expansion pack 
An expansion pack (branded as "adventure pack") titled Pirates & Nobles was released in North America on August 30, 2011. Pirates and Nobles is also included in a deluxe edition of The Sims Medieval.

The pack features a new kingdom ambition, new traits and legendary traits, new clothes, over 140 new objects (including an interrogation chair), new quests, and new social interactions. There is also a new treasure-hunting mechanic with maps, shovels, treasures, and dangers. The pack also introduces pets, new NPC pirates and a new creature, baby pit beast, which is a new type of Sim death.

Reception 

Pirates & Nobles received "average" reviews according to Metacritic.

References

External links 
 
 
 

2011 video games
Electronic Arts games
IOS games
Life simulation games
Magic Pockets games
MacOS games
Social simulation video games
The Sims
Video game prequels
Video games scored by John Debney
Video games featuring protagonists of selectable gender
Video games set in the Middle Ages
Windows games
Windows Phone games
Video games developed in the United States
Single-player video games